Sumaiyah Pandor Marope (born c. 1987) is a business student from Gaborone, Botswana, was Miss Botswana 2009. She was crowned at the Gaborone International Conference Center (GICC), on 2 May 2009. Marope traveled to South Africa to represent her home country at the Miss World 2009 competition held in Johannesburg, on 12 December 2009.

References

1980s births
Living people
Miss World 2009 delegates
People from Gaborone
Botswana female models
Botswana beauty pageant winners